Homer Martin (September 16, 1901 in Illinois – January 22, 1968) was an American trade unionist, a leader of the United Auto Workers (UAW). and socialist.

After high school he attended Hewing College and received his AB from William Jewell College. Martin then attended the Kansas City Baptist Theological Seminary for two years.

After serving in Baptist churches in Goreville, Illinois and Kansas City, Missouri, Martin went to work in the auto plants of Kansas City. He soon became active in the union movement and was appointed a Vice-President of the UAW-AFL in 1935. In 1936 he was elected President of what came to be the UAW-CIO. After he accused four union vice-presidents of "conspiracy with communists to wreck union", he was ousted and replaced by R. J. Thomas in 1938 who had been leader of the Chrysler sit-down srike in March the previous year. 

In 1938, after Fred Beal, returned from the Soviet Union was deserted by the Communist-controlled International Labour Defense because of the witness he bore to the Holodomor, Martin joined a non-partisan committee for his defense against recommittal in North Carolina where in 1929 the union organiser had been convicted in a conspiracy trial. With him on the committee were Thomas Ryun Amlie, Jerry Voorhis, Emily Greene Balch, Dorothy Kenyon and Sara Bard Field. The Committee reported hostile pressure from members of the ILD and anonymous threats.

In what was seen as "a body blow to company-dominated unionism in the auto" industry, in May 1940 Martin was removed by two main groups in the union who subsequently split apart: the Communists and their allies headed by UAW co-founder George Addes, and the Socialists and their allies, headed by Walter Reuther.

In June 1941 he testified before the House Un-American Activities Committee (HUAC) that Fascists, assisted by the Italian consul, were interfering in local politics in Detroit. He testified again before the HUAC on the presence and activities of Communists in both national labor federations, the AFL and CIO.

Martin died in 1968.

Footnotes

Further reading	
 "Homer Martin, 66, of UAW is Dead," New York Times, Jan. 24, 1968, pg. 39.

Succession

1901 births
Trade unionists from Kansas
1968 deaths
Presidents of the United Auto Workers